Tiffany Eliadis (born 7 October 1995) is an Australian football (soccer) forward who plays for Melbourne Victory. She has also played for South Melbourne.

References

1995 births
Living people
Melbourne Victory FC (A-League Women) players
A-League Women players
Women's association football forwards
Australian women's soccer players